Cyril Wickramage (born 26 January 1932: Sinhala:සිරිල් වික්‍රමගේ) is an actor and director in Sri Lankan cinema, theater and television as well as a singer. Wickramage is known for participating mainly in artistic Sinhala films. Performed as a charismatic actor in all three art forms: stage, cinema, and teledrama, Wickramage is most notable for the dramatic roles in the films, Bambaru Avith, Karumakkarayo, Seilama and Dheewari.

Personal life
Wickramage was born on 26 January 1932 in Kohila Gedera village, Kurunegala, Sri Lanka. His father Charles Wickrama, was a farmer. His mother was Lydia, a daughter of Wel Vidane. Cyril is the fifth sibling in the family with four brothers and four sisters. His father was a dancer and folk drummer in the village. He first walked 9 miles to a school run by the Salvation Army.

At a young age he joined the army but later trained as a teacher at Peradeniya University in 1954. During this time, he joined Cyril Perera's Art Institute in Mulgampola, Kandy to study music and learned to play the violin. As a teacher, Wickramage received posts at Rathmalane Deaf School. While completing his diploma at the University of Sri Jayewardenepura, Wickramage was drawn to acting. During this time, Wickramage met Somawansa Pattiarachchi who worked for the National Broadcasting Corporation and excelled violin for about two years. In the meantime, he was transferred to Wesley College, Colombo.

He is married to Winifreda Perera, the sister of music director and film actor Vincent Premasiri. The couple has two sons: Chandana, Lakshitha and two daughters: Wathsala, Disala.

Drama career
During his tenure in Wesley College, he met Sri Jayana, who worked as the dance teacher of the school. Together they produced the ballet Rana Thisara. Wickramage gained some prestige with his role in Gunasena Galpaththi's play Muhudu Puththu, his maiden acting in stage dramas. He subsequently appeared in Devatha Eliya, Kuveni, Thavath Udasanak, Dawasak Wenas, Elowa Gihin Melowa Awaa, Kada Walallu, Pabawathi, Liyathambara, Natukkaraya, Wes Muhunu, Ahasin Watunu Minissu and Idama. In the play Pabawathi, Wickramage played the role of 'King Okkaka'.

On Sisira Senaratne's invitation, Wickramage made his debut as a film actor in 1965 with a supporting role in the film Handapana. His true breakthrough came however in 1967 with the role of Gunadasa in the groundbreaking Sath Samudura. The film was highly praised in Sri Lanka and swept the 1968 Sarasaviya Film Festival. Wickramage rounded up the 1960s with roles in the art film Mokade Vune and the popular Binaramalee.

In the late-60s, Wickramage began a successful collaboration with Vasantha Obeysekera and producer Dr. Linus Dissanayake. Year 1970 saw the release of the first Vasantha-Cyril-Linus film Ves Gaththo. Dealing with such issues as alienation among rural youth, the film was expanded upon with Walmath Wuvo in 1976. Cyril made his first foray into directing with Dr. Linus in 1972 making Sihina Lowak which he also starred in. The film produced the popular song "Ma Mala Pasu Sohon Kothe" sung by W. D. Amaradeva.

Wickramage was a favorite of Dharmasena Pathiraja, appearing in almost all of his films including Ahas Gauwa, Eya Dan Loku Lamayek, Bambaru Awith, Soldadu Unnahe. The role in Bambaru Awith (1978) in particular was a major role for Wickramage. Other major directors that used Wickramage include Tissa Abeysekera in Karumakkarayo - 1980 and Dharmasiri Bandaranayake in Suddilage Kathaawa - 1985.

Wickramage has expanded into television work with roles in Numba Nadana Senehelatha, Palingu Manike, Andukole, Mihikathage Daruwo, Saapa Nokaraw Daruwane (directed by Rodney Widanapathirana), Gauwen Gauwa and Alle Lange Walauwa.

Selected television serials
 Andukole
 Kota Uda Mandira
 Mihikathage Daruwo
 Numba Nadana Senehelatha
 Palingu Manike
 Saapa Nokaraw Daruwane
 Sathya

Filmography

References

External links 

මේ රට රැකගන්න නම් ජනාධිපතිතුමන් රැකගන්න ඕනෑ...

1932 births
Sri Lankan male television actors
Sinhalese male actors
Living people
Alumni of the University of Sri Jayewardenepura
20th-century Sri Lankan male singers
Sri Lankan male film actors
People from Kurunegala